Jim McGuinness (born 16 November 1972) is an association football coach and former Gaelic footballer, coach and manager, who won the All-Ireland Senior Football Championship as both player and manager with the Donegal county team.

Having guided Donegal to the final of the 2010 All-Ireland Under 21 Football Championship, McGuinness was appointed senior manager later that year. In his time at the helm, he oversaw a Donegal team that won three Ulster Senior Football Championship titles in four seasons and led them to the 2012 All-Ireland Senior Football Championship. The 2012 final was the county's first appearance on football's ultimate stage since 1992, and only their second All-Ireland senior title in more than 120 years. McGuinness's Donegal were the only team to defeat Dublin in a championship match during Jim Gavin's time as manager, doing so in the 2014 All-Ireland semi-final, and McGuinness's condensing of the pitch influenced how Dublin subsequently improved over the next five years. McGuinness ended his Donegal career shortly after that defeat of Dublin.

McGuinness is one of very few county team managers to have taken a role at a professional sports team outside Ireland. began working with Celtic as a coach in 2012, progressing to the position of assistant manager of the club's under-20 squad. In 2017, he took up a coaching role with Beijing Sinobo Guoan, leaving in January 2018. In December 2018, he was named as the new head coach of Charlotte Independence in the USL Championship. He has worked with the German Roger Schmidt (formerly Bayer Leverkusen manager) and the Spaniard Félix Sarriugarte (formerly Athletic Bilbao manager). He has a UEFA A Licence.

McGuinness's image has been represented on a mural outside Glenties, and a statue bearing the epigraph "Jim the Redeemer" was erected at Laghy close to Lough Derg.

Early life
McGuinness was born in Glenties, County Donegal. He spent his childhood at Ard Patrick in Glenties. His brother Charles died suddenly during the night from an unknown heart problem when he was 16. McGuinness later spoke about that event: "It was a moment in your life, Ryan [Tubridy, host of The Late Late Show], where you're going along and your life is going along in a certain direction and then, just all of a sudden, you're jilted and you're going in a different direction. In many respects it was like a sledgehammer. I have to say that. I was 12, heading for 13, and you're never the same person again. And that's being honest. All of a sudden your life just changes. You're weak and you're vulnerable. There's this sense of freefall and trying to make sense of it. All I wanted to do was make things right for my mother and father, to get it back to what it was". A friend of Charles suggested the dead boy would have been "a cert for the county minors". McGuinness took the remark to heart and it proved an important motivation for his later life: "I remember them words and I remember staring at the television, and in that moment saying to myself: 'I'm going to do that. I'm going to do that'. And in that moment my focus became very, very concentrated and I became very aware of the fact that I didn't want anybody else in the room to realise what I was thinking. From that moment on, that's how I started living my life. When I would get in from school at twenty to four — we're just a couple of hundred metres from the school — at quarter to four I'd be running down the road or on the bike and I'd be in the pitch, particularly in the wintertime because you'd only have maybe 45 minutes of light. It just became a big, big part of my life".

McGuinness's boyhood hero was Jack O'Shea.

Playing career
McGuinness was called up to the county minors in 1990. In early 1992, he sufficiently impressed senior county manager Brian McEniff in a trial game in Ballyshannon to earn a call-up to the squad.

As a "scraggly-haired teen", McGuinness observed from the bench McEniff's team defeated Derry in the final of the Ulster Senior Football Championship before going on to win the All-Ireland Senior Football Championship.

McGuinness was also a star of Third-Level Colleges football, winning Sigerson Cups with Tralee in 1998 and 1999 as captain, and again as captain in 2001 with the University of Ulster at Jordanstown (UUJ). At Tralee he studied health and leisure. He played club football with Naomh Conaill, winning a Donegal Senior Football Championship in 2005. With Ireland, he played in the 1998 International Rules Series.

He also played for Donegal Boston.

After Donegal lost the final of the 1998 Ulster Senior Football Championship, Jim McGuinness — aged 25 at this time — decided to go to New York for the summer. As he and his brother Mark drove towards the airport, a lorry struck their car and killed driver Mark — aged 27. McGuinness later said: "Just as the lorry was passing us it came straight across the road and took us out of it. And that was it. We were flung, really, like a matchbox up the road and spun so many times, and the car came to a shudder and a stop. Very quickly you realised that we were in a very, very difficult situation. I just told him repeatedly that I loved him. That's what I told him. It was probably 10 years before I realised or accepted that it happened".

McGuinness scored a goal against Armagh ten minutes from the end of the 2002 Ulster Senior Football Championship final. He started the first game of Brian McEniff's last spell as Donegal manager, a league defeat to Galway in Tuam in February 2003, during which he scored a point. He made a substitute appearance for Paul McGonigle in the 2003 All-Ireland Senior Football Championship semi-final against Armagh. He played with Donegal until 2003. Upon retiring he became a fitness coach and lectured as a sports psychologist in the North West Regional College, Limavady.

Management career
At the age of 18 McGuinness was coaching underage teams. Columba McDyer, at the time the only Donegal man with an All-Ireland Senior Football Championship medal, approached him one night. He said: "I think you are going to be a coach. I want you to have this whistle", and presented him with a blue and white whistle. As of 2012, McGuinness was still using that whistle.

Naomh Conaill
The story goes that one day McGuinness tore his cruciate ligaments, broke a leg and smashed a kneecap in a game against Killybegs, leading to months spent languishing at home in self-pity and lethargy. Naomh Conaill manager Hughie Molloy asked him to coach the senior team—McGuinness accepted and in 2005 Naomh Conaill reached their first county final in 40 years. 6/1 outsiders ahead of the match, Naomh Conaill defeated a heavily fancied St Eunan's after a replay to take their first ever Donegal Senior Football Championship. The style used was reminiscent of what would later become The System.

In 2009, Naomh Conaill met St Eunan's in the County Championship Final again. McGuinness, now aged 36, was joint-manager (with Cathal Corey) of Naomh Conaill. Naomh Conaill lost that one but won the County Championship Final again the following year. McGuinness was joint-manager with Corey again in 2010.

Donegal
McGuinness was turned down several times by the Donegal County Board, on one occasion being thwarted by the lack of a plug socket for the projector needed for his PowerPoint display. "I was the only candidate [on the last occasion] and I struggled to get it", he said the week before Donegal took on Mayo in the 2012 All-Ireland Senior Football Championship Final. He had offers from other counties but held out, determined to become senior boss even when those at the top did their utmost to deprive him of the opportunity.

McGuinness was interviewed for the role of Donegal senior manager in 2007 following Brian McIver's resignation, though McIver was reappointed after reapplying when he decided to carry on. One year later when the role became available again, McGuinness was still the youngest candidate.

Under-21s

The last time he was rejected as senior manager McGuinness was given the under-21 team to manage as a consolation. Brian McEniff, who had remained close to McGuinness since McGuinness was 19 years of age, recommended him after the County Chairman asked him to appoint the next under-21 manager.

McGuinness guided his county to the 2010 All-Ireland Under-21 Football Championship final, in which they were narrowly defeated by Dublin.

Seniors

Appointment
In July 2010, McGuinness, having led Donegal to the 2010 All-Ireland U-21 Football Championship Final, was appointed as manager of the senior team when his colleague John Joe Doherty resigned in the wake of a disastrous season. His first meeting with the downcast and "demoralised" senior panel occurred at Downings Bay Hotel on 6 November 2010. He outlined his intentions: to be in the 2014 All-Ireland Senior Football Championship Final after four years of hard labour akin to an Olympiad. McGuinness drafted Kevin Cassidy into his first McKenna Cup panel, despite Cassidy announcing his intention to retire the previous season's disappointing campaign.

First year

McGuinness's first year as manager proved successful, as Donegal gained promotion to Division 1 after defeating Laois by a scoreline of 2–11 to 0–16. Donegal's 2011 All-Ireland Championship campaign began on 15 May 2011, against Antrim. Both sides performed poorly; however, Donegal ultimately triumphed, earning their first Ulster championship win for four years. On his first start in the Ulster Senior Football Championship, Ryan Bradley scored two points The Sunday Game gave him their man-of-the-match award. However, TV pundit Pat Spillane also claimed Bradley was "the best of a bad bunch" and didn't deserve the award at all, causing McGuinness to react furiously. McGuinness called Spillane's comments "way over the top".

On 17 July 2011, Donegal won their first Ulster title since 1992 when they defeated Derry by a scoreline of 1–11 to 0–8. On 30 July 2011, Donegal faced Kildare in the All-Ireland quarter-final. The sides finished level at full-time, forcing the game into extra-time. Donegal edged out Kildare by a scoreline of 1–12 to 0–14, with late points scored by captain Michael Murphy and two veterans, Christy Toye and Kevin Cassidy. Donegal were then narrowly defeated by Dublin in the semi-final on 28 August 2011; Dublin went on to become All-Ireland champions by defeating Kerry in the final.

On 10 November 2011, McGuinness dropped Kevin Cassidy from the Donegal panel after Cassidy contributed to a book (This Is Our Year). Cassidy appeared not to understand why this was so. Cassidy has not played for Donegal since. In what went down as a "surreal moment for the viewer", Mícheál Ó Domhnaill famously interviewed McGuinness following a live 2012 league game on TG4 while Cassidy, in the role of television analyst, stood beside him with his head bowed.

Second year

In his second season in charge of the Donegal senior football team, McGuinness led his team from the preliminary round of the Ulster Senior Football Championship all the way to the Sam Maguire Cup, two years ahead of schedule, half-way through his intended Olympiad.

Donegal retained the Ulster title for the first time in team history on 22 July 2012, with a 2–18 to 0–13 victory over Down. McGuinness then masterminded a comprehensive defeat of Kerry in the All-Ireland Senior Football Championship quarter-finals. This result was described by the national media as "the most seismic result in [Kerry] since the 1987 Munster final replay defeat to Cork". Pat Spillane, prominent critic of the team, was nowhere to be seen after this defeat of his own team, though he bumped into Jim McGuinness on the steps of a hotel the following week as McGuinness was being photographed receiving an award.

McGuinness then led his team to the 2012 All-Ireland Senior Football Championship Final with a comprehensive semi-final defeat of title-favourites Cork at Croke Park. Ahead of the match, Cork were favourites to win the title itself (even though this was only the semi-final). Tyrone's Mickey Harte, attempting to analyse the game for the BBC, expressed his shock: "To be honest, I could not see that coming. Donegal annihilated Cork, there is no other word for it". Martin McHugh, a member of the successful 1992 side, said it was the best ever performance by any Donegal team, including his own.

McGuinness's Donegal team defeated Mayo in the 2012 All-Ireland Senior Football Championship Final. McGuinness duetted with Daniel O'Donnell on "Destination Donegal" at the homecoming. He was later awarded Donegal Person of the Year.

Third year
Donegal's defence of their All-Ireland title began against Tyrone on 26 May 2013. The match was billed in advance as the toughest contest Donegal would face in Ulster, with the winner thought likely to become Ulster champions. Donegal brushed aside Tyrone with relative ease. McGuinness said afterwards: "In the last two years the exact same thing was said. The only difference this year was that we were relegated [from the league]. There was a lot of talk about putting all the eggs into one basket, but it was the same last year and the same the year before. That's what we do — it's championship football. It will be no different next year. It was a media spin that got the whole debate going. Next year we will put all our eggs in that basket again".

Donegal lost their Ulster title to Monaghan in the Ulster Final on a scoreline of 0–13 points to 0–7 in favour of the Farney men. Plagued by injuries, they limped past Laois in the qualifiers to face Mayo in the All Ireland Quarter Final, a rematch of the previous year's All Ireland Final. Mayo were sixteen-point winners on a scoreline of 4–17 to 1–10. In a post-match interview, McGuinness cited the second half of Mayo as one of the toughest watches of his managerial career. In September 2013, McGuinness confirmed he would be staying on for the 2014 season but that Rory Gallagher, Maxi Curran and Francie Friel had stepped down from his backroom team. On 25 September 2013, Damian Diver, John Duffy and Paul McGonigle were named as the new members of his backroom team.

Fourth year

In his fourth season in charge of the Donegal senior football team, McGuinness led his team to the 2014 Ulster Senior Football Championship, then past Armagh in the All-Ireland quarter-final, past Dublin in the All-Ireland semi-final and onwards to Kerry in the 2014 All-Ireland Senior Football Championship Final, succeeding in his original aim, set back in 2010. The semi-final victory over Dublin was particularly celebrated. Dublin had been expected to "massacre" Donegal; bookmakers were stunned by the outcome. Martin McHugh said afterwards that McGuinness was "the best manager Donegal have ever had, and one of the best in any county in the modern era", while Ireland manager Paul Earley hailed the victory as McGuinness's greatest coaching achievement. Donegal were beaten in the final by Kerry,losing 2:08 to 0:11. On 4 October 2014, McGuinness terminated his tenure as Donegal manager. He had managed Donegal through 54 league and championship matches. He gave his first interview since this on The Saturday Night Show soon afterwards.

Book
McGuinness's autobiography Until Victory Always: A Memoir was released in October 2015, and he gave a televised interview to The Late Late Show.

Other sports
After McGuinness led Donegal to the All-Ireland SFC title, the father of Paul McGinley (an acquaintance of McGuinness) asked him to tell the Irish golfer about coaching so that he could captain Team Europe in the Ryder Cup.

With no history of playing professional association football (and therefore ineligible for entry at the UEFA B Licence level), McGuinness began his involvement in coaching the sport by participating in a Kick Start (coaching) course before advancing up the scale over a decade to a decade and half. In May 2015, McGuinness said he would begin his UEFA B Licence coaching badge. He had received it by January 2017. He began his UEFA A Licence in July 2017. He later received it. McGuinness successfully applied to the Football Association of Ireland (FAI) to study for a UEFA Pro Licence in 2019, his classmates including Damien Duff and Robbie Keane. As of 2020, he still had not obtained the licence as two blocks coincided with games in which he was manager but expressed his intention to complete it later in the year (subject to the COVID-19 pandemic restrictions).

Limavady
McGuinness did work with an association football team in Limavady. This was in 2005, at North West Regional College, where he was a lecturer for several years (teaching sports psychology).

Derry City
When Stephen Kenny left Derry City, McGuinness was appointed the team's trainer, only for Kenny to return from Scotland and McGuinness to depart.

Celtic
The golfer Paul McGinley mentioned McGuinness to Dermot Desmond after speaking with the Donegal manager. Desmond invited McGuinness to several UEFA Champions League games played by the Scottish football team Celtic in Glasgow. On one such occasion, the soccer club's chief executive Peter Lawwell inquired if McGuinness would like to join.

On 9 November 2012, Celtic confirmed their intention to appoint McGuinness as a performance consultant on a part-time basis. It was expected that he would remain as the Donegal manager, spending three days each week in Scotland focusing on the soccer club's academy structure at their Lennoxtown training centre. His role at Celtic did not affect his attendance at Donegal training sessions; he attended every one.

After a stint as performance consultant, he later took over as youth coach. By 2017, he was assistant manager of the club's under-20 team.

Beijing Guoan
In June 2017, McGuinness was named as assistant coach of Chinese Super League side Beijing Sinobo Guoan, under coach Roger Schmidt. He resigned for "personal, family reasons" just over six months later in January 2018.

Charlotte Independence
In December 2018, McGuinness was named as the new head coach of Charlotte Independence in the USL Championship, where he signed a three-year contract. He was unveiled at a press conference in Montrose, South Dublin. He said that if the chance to join Celtic had not emerged, he "would be as  still managing Donegal".

On 17 January 2019, McGuinness appointed former Athletic Bilbao manager Félix Sarriugarte as his assistant coach. McGuinness also secured the loan signings of defender Andrew Gutman and Scotland national team midfielder Mark Hill, in February and March 2019 respectively. However, on 12 June 2019, McGuinness was sacked as head coach after just one win in 14 games in the 2019 USL Championship season. Independence President and Managing Partner Jim McPhilliamy thanked McGuinness for improving the club "in many ways, including bringing talent to our roster and instituting new training methodologies", and blamed the club's hierarchy, saying they wanted to keep some of his training methods in the future.

Galway Football
In October 2020, McGuinness was seen taking charge of a training session for the Galway football team. He later stated it was a once off session that happened as a result of being asked by Galway manager Pádraic Joyce.

Dundalk
In May 2020, Jim Magilton, the sporting director of League of Ireland Premier Division club Dundalk, said he had spoken to McGuinness about the club's managerial vacancy. Dundalk offered McGuinness a temporary position as a coach but McGuinness was not interested.

Media career
In 2014, Sky Sports secured a three-year deal to broadcast live matches from the All-Ireland Senior Football and Hurling Championships. McGuinness spent three years as a pundit for Sky before departing in 2017. He returned as an analyst for Sky in 2020.

Personal life
McGuinness's wife Yvonne is a sister of Colm McFadden. They have six children: Toni-Marie; Mark Anthony; Jim, Jnr; Bonnie; Aoibhe and a baby boy born in 2016.

The family moved to the United States when McGuinness took up the job as manager of Charlotte Independence and continued to live there afterwards.

Honours

Player
 All-Ireland Senior Football Championship: 1992
 Ulster Senior Football Championship: 1992
 International Rules Series: 1998
 Sigerson Cup: 1998, 1999 (c.), 2001 (c.)
 Donegal Senior Football Championship: 2005

Manager
 All-Ireland Senior Football Championship: 2012
 Ulster Senior Football Championship: 2011, 2012, 2014
 Donegal Senior Football Championship: 2005, 2010
 Donegal Person of the Year: 2012
 Donegal News Sports Personality of the Month: July 2012

See also
 List of All-Ireland Senior Football Championship winning managers
 "Jimmy's Winning Matches"

References

External links
 Jim McGuinness at gaainfo.com
 Duet with Daniel O'Donnell

1972 births
Living people
Association football coaches
Beijing Guoan F.C. non-playing staff
Celtic F.C. non-playing staff
Charlotte Independence coaches
Donegal Boston Gaelic footballers
Donegal inter-county Gaelic footballers
Gaelic football coaches
Gaelic footballers who switched code
Gaelic football managers
Gaelic football player-managers
Gaelic games writers and broadcasters
Irish expatriate sportspeople in China
Irish expatriate sportspeople in the United States
Irish international rules football players
Naomh Conaill Gaelic footballers
People from Glenties
Republic of Ireland football managers
Winners of one All-Ireland medal (Gaelic football)